You Can't Save Everybody is an album by Kieran Kane and Kevin Welch with Fats Kaplin. Claudia Scott is listed as a special guest vocalist. Rick Anderson of AllMusic stated in his review that this album was "Highly recommended overall."

Track listing

Musicians
Kieran Kane: Vocals, Guitar, Octave Mandolin, Banjo, Boxes, Shakers, Whappers, Feets
Kevin Welch: Vocals, Guitar, Octave Mandolin
Fats Kaplin: Button Accordion, Tenor Banjo, Dan Electro, Fiddle
Claudia Scott: Special Guest Vocalist

Production
Kieran Kane, Kevin Welch & Fats Kaplin: Producers
Philip Scoggins: Recorded, Mixed and Mastered
Charles Yingling: 2nd Engineer
Photography: Mark Montgomery
Graphic Design: Beech
Cover Painting: Kieran Kane

All track information and credits were taken from the CD liner notes.

References

External links
Kevin Welch Official Site
Dead Reckoning Records Official Site

2004 albums
Dead Reckoning Records albums
Kevin Welch albums
Kieran Kane albums
Fats Kaplin albums